North Pars Gas Field is one of the biggest independent gas fields of the world. This field which was discovered in 1967 is located some 120 kilometers south east of Bushehr province in water depths of 2 to 30 meters in the Persian Gulf. 

In 1963, exploration activities started in this field with carrying out seismic tests and the first exploration well was completed in 1967.

The first design to operate this field was approved in 1977 and after drilling 17 wells and installation of 26 maritime platforms and due to commencement of Islamic revolution and the imposed war the project was stopped.

The whole recovered gas from this field will be used for producing 20 Mtpa of LNG

In September 2006, China's CNOOC signed a memorandum of understanding with NIOC for development of the North Pas field.  The MoU was extended in December 2006, to incorporate development of a four-train LNG facility with a 20 mtpa capacity.

Final negotiations for development of North Pars gas field is going on with a Chinese company.

See also

World Largest Gas Fields
NIOC Recent Discoveries
Iran Natural Gas Reserves
South Pars Gas Field
Kish Gas Field
Golshan Gas Field
Ferdowsi Gas Field
Persian LNG

References

Natural gas fields in Iran